A draft is a process used in some countries (especially in North America) and sports (especially in closed leagues) to allocate certain players to teams. In a draft, teams take turns selecting from a pool of eligible players. When a team selects a player, the team receives exclusive rights to sign that player to a contract, and no other team in the league may sign the player. The process is similar to round-robin item allocation.

The best-known type of draft is the entry draft, which is used to allocate players who have recently become eligible to play in a league. Depending on the sport, the players may come from college, high school or junior teams, or teams in other countries. An entry draft is intended to prevent expensive bidding wars for young talent and to ensure that no team can sign contracts with all of the best young players and make the league uncompetitive. To encourage parity, teams that do poorly in the previous season usually get to choose first in the postseason draft, sometimes with a "lottery" factor to discourage teams from deliberately losing.

Other types of drafts include the expansion draft, in which a new team selects players from other teams in the league, and the dispersal draft, in which a league's surviving teams select players from the roster of a newly defunct franchise. Major professional sports leagues also have special contingency plans for rebuilding a team via a disaster draft, should an accident or other disaster kill or disable many players.

Drafts are usually permitted under antitrust or restraint of trade laws because they are included in collective bargaining agreements between leagues and labor unions representing players. These agreements generally stipulate that after a certain number of seasons, a player whose contract has expired becomes a free agent and can sign with any team. They also require minimum and sometimes maximum salaries for newly drafted players. Leagues may also allow teams to trade draft picks among each other in exchange for other draft picks or in exchange for players.

In 1935, National Football League president Joseph Carr instituted the NFL Draft as a way to restrain teams' payrolls and reduce the dominance of the league's perennial contenders. It was adopted by the precursor of the National Basketball Association in 1947; by the National Hockey League in 1963; and by Major League Baseball in 1965, although draft systems had been used in baseball since the 19th century.

Major Indoor Lacrosse League (National Lacrosse League) adopted a collegiate draft in 1988, Major League Soccer in 2000, Major League Lacrosse in 2001, and Major League Rugby in 2020.

Sports drafts are uncommon outside the U.S. and Canada. Most professional football clubs and those in other sports obtain young players through transfers from smaller clubs or by developing youth players through their own academies. The youth system is operated directly by the teams themselves, who develop their players from childhood. Parity in these leagues is instead maintained through promotion and relegation, which automatically expels the weakest teams from a league in exchange for the strongest teams in the next lower league.

Australia

AFL draft

In Australian rules football's premier competition, the Australian Football League (AFL), a draft was introduced in 1986 when the competition was then known as the Victorian Football League (VFL). This was in response to the increasing transfer fees and player salaries at the time, which in combination with declining attendances, threatened to derail the league. It was also a result of the failure of country zoning, introduced in the late 1960s, which had led to a systematic inequality whereby the clubs with the best zones, like Carlton and Hawthorn, could dominate over clubs with poorer zones like Melbourne.

In the AFL Draft, clubs receive picks based on the position in which they finish on the ladder. Therefore, the teams that finish at the bottom of the AFL ladder will get the first draft picks. Also, any team that finishes in a low ladder position for consecutive seasons will receive priority picks.

The AFL's National Draft is held in November, with a pre-season draft and a rookie draft held in December.

NSWRL draft
The 1991 NSWRL season featured the introduction of rugby league football's first draft system. The draft allowed teams to recruit players on a roster system based on where the club finished the previous year. It ran in reverse order with the wooden spooners getting first choice and the premiers last. The draft lasted just the one season before being defeated in the courts by players and coaches opposed to its limitations.

Europe

KHL draft

When the Russian Superleague became the Kontinental Hockey League, the collective bargaining agreement between the KHL and its players introduced a draft, starting from the very first season of the league. It also allowed teams to use a first-round draft pick to select protected players from a team's farm system. The KHL Junior Draft was discontinued in 2016.

The Hundred

A draft system is used for The Hundred, a professional franchise 100-ball cricket tournament in England and Wales run by the England and Wales Cricket Board (ECB), which started in 2021. The inaugural Hundred draft took place in October 2019.

North America

CFL draft

The Canadian Football League holds its annual player draft before the start of the season, either in the last days of April or the start of May. It was formerly held as part of the annual league meetings in Hamilton, but is now typically held by conference call with the first two rounds being broadcast live on TSN. Since 2016, the draft has consisted of eight rounds, with teams drafting in inverse order of their records in the previous season, with the Grey Cup runner-up selecting second-to-last and the Grey Cup champion selecting last. As with the NFL Draft, trading of picks is very common, meaning that a team will not necessarily have eight picks in a given draft.

The draft is restricted to Canadian citizens, plus non-citizens who were raised in Canada since childhood (see the relevant section of the main CFL article). Eligible players can be drafted both from U Sports football programs in Canada and U.S. college football programs (with the latter category containing one Canadian school, Simon Fraser).

International players, which can compose up to half of a CFL team's roster, are not subject to a draft and enter the league by way of the negotiation list, a process that allows a CFL team to unilaterally stake claim to any international player on a first-come, first-served basis without the player's consent and bar them from negotiating with any other CFL team. This includes almost all of the league's quarterbacks.

Global T20 Canada 
In the inaugural 2018 Global T20 Canada a player draft was held for franchises to choose the players from the available pool.

NFL draft

Draft order in the NFL is determined in a reverse-record order (the previous season's worst team picking first, the Super Bowl winner picking last). There are 7 rounds of the draft (a maximum of 260 picks), so each team can have 7 selections, plus whatever compensatory selections a team receives as a result of free agency (up to 32 compensatory selections are given each year), and any picks awarded for developing minority candidates for NFL head coaching or general manager positions (starting with the 2021 draft in accordance with NFL Resolution JC-2A). Teams are allowed to trade draft picks (including compensation picks since 2017) among each other in exchange for other draft picks or in exchange for players.

Because the NFL requires that players be three years removed from high school, and of the lack of an effective junior development system outside the college and university programs, players are chosen almost exclusively from National Collegiate Athletic Association college football programs.

The NFL Draft has become one of the key events on the American football calendar, airing live on television each April. In recent years it had been held at New York's Radio City Music Hall, but in 2015 and 2016 it was held at Chicago's Auditorium Theatre, and in 2017 it was held on the Rocky Steps at the Philadelphia Museum of Art. The 2018 draft was the first ever to be held at an NFL stadium, namely the Dallas Cowboys' AT&T Stadium.

NBA draft

The NBA Draft, held historically in another NBA city, but in recent drafts it has been held either in a theater in the New York area or the Barclays Center each summer, is only two rounds long (60 picks). Instead of automatically granting the top pick to the worst team from the year before, the NBA holds a draft lottery to determine who chooses first. The top four picks are allocated by chance among the 14 teams that did not make the playoffs the year before. This discourages a team from losing on purpose to get a better draft pick, but also causes other controversies such as allegations and conspiracy theories suggesting that the draft lottery is rigged.

NBA teams choose players from the NCAA and from teams overseas. It was formerly common for players to be chosen directly from high school, but in 2006, the NBA required that players wait a year after high school before playing in the NBA. Almost all top U.S. players thus play at least one year in college.

NHL draft

The NHL operates a seven-round off-season draft (224 picks). Like the NBA, the NHL uses a lottery system to determine which team gets the top pick. All 16 teams, up from 15 between 2017 and 2021, that failed to qualify for the playoffs take part in the weighted lottery with the winner moving up to select first overall. Any North American player aged 18–20, and any overseas player aged 18–21 is eligible to be selected. Players are generally chosen from junior hockey teams, high schools, the NCAA and overseas clubs.

The NHL rotates the draft's location among cities with teams in the league. Like baseball, players drafted in the entry draft usually have to wait a few years in development, either in junior hockey or the minor leagues, before cracking an NHL roster; usually, only one or two draft picks, generally, those that are widely predicted to be blue-chip superstars, jump directly from the draft to the NHL (e.g. Sidney Crosby or Jaromír Jágr).

The league has incrementally expanded the draft lottery process over the course of the early 2010s to discourage "tanking"—the act of deliberately losing to get a better draft pick. Historically, the league only subjected the first overall pick to the draft lottery among the five worst teams in the league, meaning that if a draft had more than one marquee prospect (a generally rare occurrence), it would still be a viable strategy to tank, as a second overall pick was still guaranteed. This was made evident in the 2015 NHL Entry Draft, where marquee prospects Connor McDavid and Jack Eichel were both seen as NHL-ready and likely to be stars; much speculation surrounded the struggling Buffalo Sabres, who allegedly tanked to secure the rights to at least the second overall pick (a charge that, although the Sabres' fans openly encouraged it, the team officially denied). From the 2016 to 2020 drafts, the top three overall picks were subject to lottery among all fourteen teams that did not make the playoffs, meaning the last-place team will only be assured of the fourth overall pick, at which point virtually any marquee prospect will have already been selected. Since the 2021 draft, only two draws are held for the first two selections. Starting with the 2022 lottery, the team winning one of the two lotteries is only allowed to move up a maximum of ten spots in the draft order and teams will only be allowed to win the lottery twice in a five-year period.

The three major junior leagues that make up the Canadian Hockey League also hold drafts of teenage players in their territories.

MLB draft

Major League Baseball holds two drafts each year. In June, the First-Year Player Draft, MLB's entry draft, takes place. Only players from Canada, the U.S. or a U.S. territory may be drafted; players from elsewhere are free agents and can be signed by any team. Draftees are high-school graduates who have opted not to go to college; college baseball players at four-year institutions who have played three years or turned 21; or junior college baseball players. As of 2021, the draft lasts 20 rounds (down from 40 in 2019 with the exception of a 5-round 2020 draft), but earlier drafts have lasted up to 100 rounds. The MLB Draft generally receives less attention than the drafts in other American sports, since drafted players usually spend several years in the minor leagues before they crack the Major League team's roster. Also, unlike the MLS, NFL, NBA and the NHL Drafts, the MLB Draft takes place during the season instead of in the offseason.

In December, MLB holds the much shorter Rule 5 draft. If an organization keeps a player in the minor leagues for a certain number of years, other teams can draft him in the Rule 5 draft. The drafting team must keep the player on its major league roster; it cannot put the player in its own minor leagues system.

MLC draft

See Major League Cricket.

MLL draft

MLL implemented its first collegiate draft in 2001. The draft was held every year until MLL merged with the Premier Lacrosse League in December 2020, with the merged league operating under the PLL banner.

MLS draft

Major League Soccer has two types of draft that occur each year, plus a third that is held intermittently when the league adds one or more teams. The two annual drafts are the three-round long MLS SuperDraft (a maximum of 81 picks since 2021, down from four rounds and 104 picks in 2020), which was held for the first time in 2001, and MLS Supplemental Draft, with the MLS Expansion Draft held in the offseason immediately before the league expands.

The MLS SuperDraft happens every January. During the draft the teams from the league will pick up to three players each from colleges across the United States. Only players from the American college sports system (e.g., the NCAA and the NAIA) are eligible to be drafted. Canadian U Sports men's soccer players are not included. 

The draft is divided into three rounds in which each club has one selection.

In addition to drafted players, MLS teams also acquire new players from their youth academies. These players are called homegrown players. Homegrown player are academy players who is given a first-team contract. They are required to have spent at least one year in a club’s academy, and to have lived in the club’s territory (for example, in the case of Orlando City, northern Florida).

The draft gives to the teams opportunity to acquire players from other regions of the country, from outside their territory. 

The teams can also acquire new players by signing players from other leagues (usually foreigner leagues). MLS has two transfer windows—the primary pre-season transfer window lasts three months from mid February until mid May, and the secondary mid season transfer window runs one month from early July to early August.

MLR draft

Major League Rugby implemented its first collegiate draft in 2020. Players are eligible for draft after 3 years in college at 21 years old. Free agents can try to join teams at 18 years old.

MLW draft

Major League Wrestling held its first draft in 2021.

NLL draft

NLL held its first collegiate draft in 1988 as Major Indoor Lacrosse League.

NWSL draft

The National Women's Soccer League held its first drafts prior to its inaugural 2013 season. The first was a draft of college players, followed by a supplemental draft. The final draft was a preseason waiver draft in which teams could select players who had been waived by their first squads, but only one player was selected at that time.

The college draft has been held prior to each league season. The waiver draft, now called the "re-entry wire", has also been a permanent part of the league. With league expansion and contraction since its establishment, both expansion drafts (intended to help stock the rosters of new teams) and dispersal drafts (in which teams could select players from defunct teams) have been irregularly held.

PLL draft
The Premier Lacrosse League held its first collegiate draft in 2019, shortly before the start of its inaugural season.

WNBA draft

The WNBA Draft is held every spring. It has had several locations during its history; the most recent draft in 2022 took place in New York City, following two drafts held virtually due to COVID-19 concerns. The draft is currently three rounds long with each of the 12 teams in the league (trades aside) getting three picks each. Draft order for teams that made the playoffs the previous year are based on team records. The team with the highest previous record will pick last. Since eight teams qualify for playoffs, the bottom eight picks are determined by this method. For the remaining top four picks, a selection process similar to the NBA Draft Lottery is conducted for the four teams that did not qualify for the playoffs.

WWE Draft

The WWE Draft is used to refresh WWE's Raw and SmackDown rosters, as well as shuffle talent between the two.

South Asia

IPL auction
Cricket's Indian Premier League instead holds a yearly auction before the start of each season in which teams bid on players, subject to a salary cap and restrictions on roster size.

ISL draft
Indian Super League is responsible for holding drafts prior to the commencement of each season. Teams can buy foreign players with international experience while they still can purchase Indian players with little or no experience.

PSL draft
The Pakistan Super League uses a draft system for player recruitment before the start of every season to fairly distribute the league's new players. Teams are allotted slots in every round of the draft and slots can be exchanged with other teams.

Southeast Asia

PBA draft

The Philippine Basketball Association (PBA) draft is an annual event in the PBA calendar in which teams can acquire new players outside the league which are not free agents.  Only natural-born Filipinos and foreign nationals with Filipino ancestry, whether or not they acquired Philippine citizenship, are eligible to be drafted. The draft began in 1985; prior to that teams directly hired rookies.

Until 2014, there was a draft lottery between the two worst team of the preceding season. This was scrapped after the events of the 2014 draft lottery.

The PBA Developmental League also has their own draft.

Other terminology

Draft bust
A draft bust is a highly touted or highly selected draftee who does not meet expectations. A player is also regarded as a larger bust if more successful players are drafted after them.

NFL
One of the most frequently cited examples of a draft bust in the NFL is Ryan Leaf, who was drafted in the 1998 NFL Draft by the San Diego Chargers second overall, after the Indianapolis Colts selected Hall of Famer Peyton Manning. The Chargers passed on fellow Hall of Famers Charles Woodson, Randy Moss and Alan Faneca to draft Leaf, 
who despite being described as being equal in talent to Manning prior to the draft, only managed to play two years with the Chargers and start only 18 games (winning only four) for them before being released. Leaf failed to find success elsewhere and was out of the league after four seasons. 

Tony Mandarich and JaMarcus Russell, two other frequently cited draft busts, are examples of players whose statuses as busts are amplified by their placements in the draft: Mandarich was selected second overall in the 1989 NFL Draft by the Green Bay Packers after Hall of Famer Troy Aikman, and ahead of Hall of Famers Barry Sanders, Derrick Thomas, Deion Sanders and Steve Atwater as well as six future Pro Bowlers. Russell was selected first overall in the 2007 NFL Draft by the Oakland Raiders, ahead of Hall of Famers Calvin Johnson, Joe Thomas and Darrelle Revis, as well as future Pro Bowlers Adrian Peterson, Patrick Willis, Marshawn Lynch, Eric Weddle, Ryan Kalil and Greg Olsen. Like Leaf, Russell was cut after three seasons and was soon out of the league, while Mandarich later managed to become a serviceable offensive lineman for the Indianapolis Colts but ultimately never lived up to his draft position. 

Other frequently cited examples include Akili Smith (the New Orleans Saints had offered the Cincinnati Bengals nine future draft picks in exchange for their No. 3 first round pick, which the Bengals declined to draft Smith), Charles Rogers (who was drafted one spot ahead of seven-time Pro Bowler Andre Johnson), Lawrence Phillips (the St. Louis Rams had traded Hall of Famer Jerome Bettis in the belief that Phillips could better fill his role), Todd Marinovich (remembered for both his unorthodox upbringing and being drafted ahead of Hall of Famer Brett Favre), and Tim Couch (who was drafted first overall by the expansion Cleveland Browns in the 1999 NFL Draft, immediately ahead of Donovan McNabb).

NBA
In the NBA, the most well-known example of a draft bust is LaRue Martin, drafted 1st overall in the 1972 NBA Draft ahead of Bob McAdoo and Julius Erving. Martin had a career average of just 5.3 points per game and was out of the NBA four years later, while McAdoo and Erving went on to be inducted to the Naismith Memorial Basketball Hall of Fame and are usually mentioned as all-time greats. McAdoo and Erving were both selected to the NBA 75th Anniversary Team. Another well-known example is Sam Bowie, who while proving to be a serviceable though injury-prone player, was haunted by being drafted second overall in the famously talent-rich 1984 NBA draft behind Hall of Famer Hakeem Olajuwon and ahead of Hall of Famers Michael Jordan, Charles Barkley and John Stockton.

Other notable examples include Michael Olowokandi in the 1998 NBA draft (ahead of Mike Bibby, Antawn Jamison, Vince Carter, Dirk Nowitzki, and Paul Pierce), Kwame Brown in 2001 NBA draft (ahead of Tyson Chandler, Pau Gasol, and Tony Parker), Darko Miličić in 2003 NBA draft (after LeBron James and ahead of Carmelo Anthony, Chris Bosh, and Dwyane Wade), Adam Morrison in 2006 NBA draft, (After LaMarcus Aldridge, ahead of Brandon Roy). Greg Oden in 2007 NBA draft (ahead of Kevin Durant), Hasheem Thabeet in 2009 NBA draft (ahead of James Harden, Stephen Curry, and DeMar DeRozan), Derrick Williams in 2011 NBA draft (ahead of Klay Thompson and Kawhi Leonard), Michael Kidd-Gilchrist in 2012 NBA draft (after Anthony Davis and ahead of Bradley Beal and Damian Lillard), Anthony Bennett in 2013 NBA draft (ahead of Giannis Antetokounmpo and Rudy Gobert), Jabari Parker in 2014 NBA draft (ahead of Joel Embiid and Nikola Jokić). More recent examples include Jahlil Okafor in 2015 NBA draft (ahead of Kristaps Porziņģis and Devin Booker) and Markelle Fultz in 2017 NBA draft (ahead of Jayson Tatum, Donovan Mitchell, and Bam Adebayo). 

MLB

Notable draft busts include Steve Chilcott (1966) and Brien Taylor (1991), 1st overall draft picks who never reached the majors.

Matt Bush (2004), another 1st overall pick, dealt with legal troubles culminating in incarceration and waited nearly 12 years to make the major leagues, eventually doing so as a middle relief pitcher in 2016. A player like outfielder Josh Hamilton (1999) can also be considered a draft bust before unexpectedly turning their career around.

NHL
A notable draft bust was Alexandre Daigle (1993), who is notable for saying "I'm glad I went number one, cause no one remembers number two" upon being drafted by the Ottawa Senators. The number two selection that year happened to be Hall of Famer Chris Pronger.

Other players such as Rick DiPietro, Alek Stojanov, Patrik Štefan, Pavel Brendl, Nail Yakupov, Griffin Reinhart, Gord Kluzak, Hugh Jessiman, and Greg Joly have also been cited as major draft busts.

Australian Football League
Examples include former Essendon player Scott Gumbleton and former Hawthorn player Mitch Thorp. Gumbleton and Thorp was drafted with picks 2 and 6 respectively in the 2006 AFL Draft ahead of future All-Australian players Travis Boak, Joel Selwood, James Frawley, and Jack Riewoldt. Thorp managed just two games in three years with Hawthorn before being delisted while Gumbleton managed just 35 games in six years with Essendon before being traded to Fremantle, subsequently retiring without playing a single game for his new club.

Draft steal
Conversely, a player drafted at a low spot, yet went on to have a stellar and productive career is known as a draft steal.

MLB
Mike Piazza, who went on to become one of the best catchers of the 1990s, a 12-time MLB All-Star selection and a Hall of Famer, was chosen in the 62nd round (1390th overall) of the 1988 MLB draft and was selected only as a favor to Tommy Lasorda (whose team, the Los Angeles Dodgers, drafted Piazza): to further put the pick in historic perspective, the MLB draft is now much shorter, having most recently been reduced from 40 rounds to 20 in 2021.

NFL
One of the most notable examples is Tom Brady, who was drafted late in the sixth round (at 199th overall pick) by the then-mediocre New England Patriots only as a fourth-string backup quarterback, but went on to have a two-decade career winning seven Super Bowls (six with the Patriots and one with the Tampa Bay Buccaneers) and three NFL MVPs. Similarly, two-time Super Bowl champion Roger Staubach was a tenth round pick in both the AFL and NFL drafts, largely due to having a four-year commitment to serve in the U.S. Navy.

Pro Football Hall of Fame quarterback Brett Favre was a second round pick, while fellow Hall of Famers Joe Montana, Aeneas Williams and Dan Fouts were all third round picks, with Montana slipping due to an average showing at the combine. Drew Brees, MVP of Super Bowl XLIV, dropped to the second round after being generally dismissed by scouts due to a mediocre performance at the combine and his height, but went on to break or set NFL records for passing yards and touchdown passes and would eventually set the record for all-time passing yardage in 2018.

Aaron Rodgers fell to the 24th overall pick in the 2005 draft, despite being expected to be picked first overall by the San Francisco 49ers, but has since won Super Bowl XLV and been a four-time League MVP.

Russell Wilson was a third-round pick due to his height (5'11"/1.80 m) but went on to become the second-highest rated NFL passer of all time.

Johnny Unitas, who is considered one of the greatest quarterbacks in the history of the game, was drafted in the ninth round of the 1955 Draft by the Pittsburgh Steelers, who cut him at the end of the team's training camp.

Bart Starr, a two-time Super Bowl MVP and multiple-championship winner, was the 200th overall pick in 1956 due to concerns about back injury problems.

Quarterback Kirk Cousins was drafted in the fourth round by the Washington Redskins in 2012 as a backup to Robert Griffin III, but became the team's full-time starter in 2015 and played out two more seasons in Washington before signing the first fully guaranteed contract for any player in NFL history with the Minnesota Vikings in 2018.

Antonio Brown was drafted 195th overall by the Pittsburgh Steelers in 2010 but was an All-Pro receiver from 2013 to 2018, before being traded to the Oakland Raiders in 2019 (later getting released by them, and later the New England Patriots, over accusations of sexual assault), and the Tampa Bay Buccaneers, with whom he won Super Bowl LV.

Jason Kelce was drafted in the sixth round, 191st overall by the Philadelphia Eagles in the 2011 NFL Draft. As of the end of the 2022 NFL Season, Kelce has been selected to six Pro Bowl teams and five All-Pro teams. Kelce also helped the Eagles reach two Super Bowls and won Super Bowl LII.

Justin Jefferson was drafted 22nd overall by the Minnesota Vikings in the 2020 NFL Draft, and has gone to 3 consecutive Pro Bowls and was #1 in receiving yards (1,809) for the 2022 NFL Season, despite 4 other Wide Receivers being drafted ahead of him.

NBA
Manu Ginóbili, a key contributor to four San Antonio Spurs championships in the 21st century and the centerpiece of Argentina's national team in 2004, was the next-to-last pick (57th) in the 1999 NBA draft. 

Another notable draft steal is Isaiah Thomas, who was selected as the 60th and last pick in the 2011 NBA draft, but emerged as an All-Star in 2017 and led the Boston Celtics to the No.1 seed in the Eastern Conference that same year. He also finished 5th in MVP voting in 2017. 

Draymond Green, who was selected as the 35th pick in the 2012 NBA draft, was a key contributor to the Golden State Warriors winning four championships. Green has been named to multiple All-Star selections and also won the NBA Defensive Player of the Year Award in 2017. 

Nikola Jokić, a Serbian who was selected as the 41st pick in the 2014 NBA draft, remained in Europe for the 2014–15 season to develop his skills before arriving in the NBA in 2015. In his second season, he quickly became a solid post playmaker, averaging about 16.7 ppg, 4.9 apg, and 9.8 rpg. He was also named to the All-NBA Team in both 2019 (first team) and 2020 (second team), and was voted in as an All-Star in both seasons before being named league MVP in 2021 and 2022. He was the first 2nd round pick to win MVP since Willis Reed in 1970. Reed was the 8th pick. 

DeAndre Jordan, who was selected as the 35th pick in the 2008 NBA draft, became an All-Star in 2017 and led the league in rebounding two years in a row (2014, 2015). He became a significant contributor of the "Lob City Clippers" era for the Los Angeles Clippers, along with Blake Griffin and Chris Paul. 

Kyle Korver, who was selected as the 51st pick in the 2003 NBA draft, went to have a successful 17-year career in the NBA. He was an All-Star in 2015 and is one of the most prolific 3-point shooters in league history, ranking fifth all-time in 3-point field goals made with 2450. 

Jordan Clarkson, who was selected as the 46th pick in the 2014 NBA draft, won the NBA Sixth Man of the Year Award in 2021. 

Malcolm Brogdon, who was the 36th pick in the 2016 NBA draft, won the Rookie of the Year award in 2017 and became a member of the exclusive 50–40–90 club in 2019. 

Marc Gasol is also another example as he was selected as the 48th pick by the Los Angeles Lakers in the 2007 NBA draft, but was traded to the Memphis Grizzlies in a package that sent his older brother Pau to the Lakers. Like his brother Pau, he became an elite rim protector who could pass, shoot, and score efficiently in the post, and later in his career became an example of a "stretch five", a center capable of effective scoring from three-point range. He was also the 2013 NBA Defensive Player of the Year, and he helped the Toronto Raptors win their first championship in 2019.

NHL
The 1984 Entry Draft is noted for the unusually high number of future Hall of Famers picked, particularly in lower rounds: Patrick Roy, the only player with three Conn Smythe trophies, was drafted 51st in the third round; Brett Hull, the fifth highest goal scorer of all time, was drafted 117th in the sixth round; and Luc Robitaille, retired as the highest-scoring left winger in the NHL, was drafted 171st in the ninth round.

A Hall of Famer Doug Gilmour was drafted by the St. Louis Blues in the seventh round, 134th overall at the 1982 NHL Entry Draft, during his career he has scored over 1400 points, won a Stanley Cup and Frank J. Selke Trophy.

Pavel Datsyuk, also drafted 171st in the 1998 NHL Entry Draft, won two Stanley Cups and is considered one of the most talented NHL players of all-time.

The Detroit Red Wings have drafted Nicklas Lidström (53rd in 1989), Sergei Fedorov (74th in 1989), Vladimir Konstantinov (221st in 1989), Tomas Holmström (257th in 1994) and Henrik Zetterberg (210th in 1999) in later rounds, who won multiple Stanley Cups with the Red Wings respectively.

Similarly, The Tampa Bay Lightning have also drafted Alex Killorn (77th in 2007), Nikita Kucherov (58th in 2011), Ondrej Palat (208th in 2011), Cédric Paquette (101st in 2012), Brayden Point (79th in 2014), Anthony Cirelli (72nd in 2015), Mathieu Joseph (120th in 2015) and Ross Colton (118th in 2016) in later rounds, would go to win back-to-back Stanley Cups with the Lightning in 2020 and 2021.

Vezina Trophy winners Dominik Hašek (drafted 199th in 1983), Tim Thomas (drafted 217th in 1994), Miikka Kiprusoff (drafted 116th in 1995), Ryan Miller (drafted 138th in 1999), Henrik Lundqvist (drafted 205th in 2000), Pekka Rinne (drafted 258th in 2004) and Connor Hellebuyck (drafted 130th in 2012), were considered one of the best goalie draft steals.

Theoren Fleury was drafted by the Calgary Flames in the 8th round, 166th overall, at the 1987 NHL Entry Draft, has scored over 1,000 points, while playing 1,000 games in the NHL between 1989 and 2003. 

Joe Pavelski was drafted by the San Jose Sharks in the 7th round, 205th overall, at the 2003 NHL Entry Draft, has become one of the best American-born players of his generation.

Patric Hörnqvist was drafted last by the Nashville Predators at the 2005 NHL Entry Draft (230th in the 7th round), has won two Stanley Cups with the Pittsburgh Penguins.

Jamie Benn was drafted by the Dallas Stars in the 5th round, 129th overall in 2007, became the franchise's sixth captain in 2013 and won the Art Ross Trophy in 2015.

Mark Stone was drafted in the 6th round, 178th overall by the Ottawa Senators, and has been nominated for the Frank J. Selke Trophy (awarded to the league's best defensive forward) as a member and now captain of the Vegas Golden Knights. 

Johnny Gaudreau, drafted in the 4th round, 104th overall by the Calgary Flames in 2011, ended the 2020-2021 NHL season with 494 career points in 520 NHL games. He also finished tied for second in points during the regular season in 2021-22.

Australian Football League
An example of a draft steal is Hawthorn midfielder Sam Mitchell who was drafted with pick 36 in the 2001 AFL Draft. Mitchell went on to become a four-time premiership player, a premiership captain with Hawthorn in 2008, a two time All-Australian, a four time Peter Crimmins Medallist, the 2003 AFL Rising Star, and won the 2012 Brownlow Medal.

Another example of a draft steal in the AFL is former Essendon midfielder James Hird, who was drafted with pick 79 in the 1990 AFL Draft. Hird went on to become a two time premiership player, a premiership captain in 2000, the 1996 Brownlow Medalist, the 2000 Norm Smith Medallist, a five-time All-Australian, a five-time W. S. Crichton Medalist, and a member of the Essendon Team of the Century and the Australian Football Hall of Fame.

Another notable AFL draft steal is Collingwood midfielder Dane Swan, who was drafted with pick 58 in the 2001 AFL Draft. Swan became a premiership player with Collingwood, a three-time Copeland Trophy winner, the 2011 Brownlow Medalist and a five-time All-Australian.

Other
Mr. Irrelevant is a title given to the last player selected in each year's NFL Draft. The phrase pokes fun at the typically poor chances such a player has of ultimately making an impact in the league, although several went on to productive NFL careers.

Some unusual draft picks in professional sports history have included Taro Tsujimoto, a fictional Japanese ice hockey forward who was drafted in the 1974 NHL amateur draft by the Buffalo Sabres (a move made in protest of the league's decision to hold the draft by phone); actor John Wayne, who at age 64 was legally drafted by the Atlanta Falcons in the 1972 NFL Draft; and Derrell Robertson, a man who was mistakenly drafted by the Ottawa Rough Riders in the 1995 CFL Dispersal Draft for the Las Vegas Posse after his death in the previous year.

See also
 Closed league
 Mock draft
 Salary cap
 List of basketball leagues that have a draft

References

External links
 NRL revisits the draft – The Sun-Herald, February 9, 2003.
 ESPN.com: Page 2 : The 100 worst draft picks ever

 
Sports terminology